Kim Yong-gun (born May 8, 1946) is a South Korean actor. His sons Ha Jung-woo and Cha Hyun-woo are also actors.

Filmography

Film

Television series

Variety show

Music video

Awards

References

External links
 
 
 

Male actors from Seoul
South Korean male film actors
South Korean male television actors
1946 births
Living people
Gwangsan Kim clan